is a former Japanese football player. He currently chairman of J. League since 31 January 2022.

Playing career
Nonomura was born in Shizuoka on May 8, 1972. After graduating from Keio University, he joined JEF United Ichihara in 1995. He played many matches as defensive midfielder and right side midfielder from first season. The club won the 2nd place in 1998 J.League Cup. However his opportunity to play decreased in 1999 and he moved to J2 League club Consadole Sapporo in 2000. He played as regular player and the club won the champions in 2000 and was promoted to J1 League from 2001. He retired end of 2001 season.

After retirement
After retirement, Nonomura became a chairman for Consadole Sapporo (later Hokkaido Consadole Sapporo) in March 2013.In 31 January 2022, Nonomura became a chairman for J. League.

Club statistics

References

External links

1972 births
Living people
Keio University alumni
Association football people from Shizuoka Prefecture
Japanese footballers
J1 League players
J2 League players
JEF United Chiba players
Hokkaido Consadole Sapporo players
Association football midfielders